Đông Hà is the capital of Quảng Trị Province, Vietnam. Đông Hà is situated at the crossroads of National Highway 1A and Route 9, part of the East–West Economic Corridor (EWEC). It lies on the North–South Railway (Reunification Express) and is served by Đông Hà Railway Station. EWEC is an economic development program which includes northeast Thailand, Southern Laos, and central Vietnam.

History

The city was initially part of Champa, until it was conquered by the Qin Empire who were in control of most of Vietnam at the time. In the 2nd century CE, the Cham people rebelled against Chinese rule. During the 14th and 15th century, ethnic Vietnamese gradually replaced the Cham inhabitants.

During the Vietnam War, Đông Hà was the northernmost town in South Vietnam and was the location of a strategically important United States Marine Corps Đông Hà Combat Base, to support Marine positions along the Vietnamese Demilitarized Zone (DMZ). During the so-called Easter Offensive in 1972, the town was the scene of a ferocious battle between the South Vietnamese army and invading North Vietnamese armored forces. The North Vietnamese army captured the town on 28 April 1972, and it was never regained by the South Vietnamese.

Tourists come to Đông Hà nowadays, especially ex-servicemen from the U.S. and Vietnam, who nearly always include a DMZ tour in their programs. The contemporary Vietnamese singer Như Quỳnh was born in Đông Hà in 1970.

Climate
Đông Hà has a tropical monsoon climate (Köppen Am). The dry season lasts from January to July, though there is a secondary rainfall peak in May.

See also

References

Populated places in Quảng Trị province
Districts of Quảng Trị province
 
Cities in Vietnam
Provincial capitals in Vietnam